Kenneth Donald Chisholm Turnbull (February 10, 1920 - September 14, 2008) was a Canadian football player who played for the Toronto Argonauts. He won the Grey Cup with them in 1947.

References

1920 births
2008 deaths
Canadian football people from Toronto
Toronto Argonauts players
Players of Canadian football from Ontario